Bathyopsis is an extinct genus of uintathere. It lived in North America during the Eocene.

Description 

References

Further reading 
 Lucas, S.G. and R.M. Schoch. 1998. Dinocerata. pp. 284–291 in C.M. Janis, K.M. Scott, and L.L. Jacobs (eds.) Evolution of Tertiary Mammals of North America Cambridge University Press, Cambridge.
 The Beginning of the Age of Mammals by Kenneth D. Rose

Dinoceratans
Extinct mammals of North America
Fossil taxa described in 1881
Prehistoric placental genera